Andrew Kelly (born 26 June 1981 in Alexandria, Scotland) is a former Scotland Club XV international rugby union player. He played for Glasgow Warriors at the Tighthead Prop position.

Rugby Union career

Amateur career

He came through the Ayr RFC youth system before being snapped up by the Warriors. He played for Glasgow Hutchesons Aloysians and moved back to Ayr in 2010.

Professional career

He was a member of the 1999 Glasgow Thistles squad which went to New Zealand for rugby training.

From Ayr he signed for Glasgow Warriors.

International career

He has played for the Scotland U21 side.

He has also played for the Scotland Club XV.

External links 

Scottish rugby biography
Pro12 biography
Statbuker biography

References 

1981 births
Living people
Ayr RFC players
Glasgow Hutchesons Aloysians RFC players
Glasgow Warriors players
Rugby union players from Alexandria, West Dunbartonshire
Scotland Club XV international rugby union players
Scottish rugby union players
Rugby union props